Cameron Frank Leslie (born May 1973) is a London nightclub manager. He and Keith Reilly operate Fabric, which they co-founded in 1999. In 2008 they opened a second club, Matter, at the O2, which closed in summer 2010.

References

1973 births
Living people
Music promoters
Nightclub owners